Eliahu Ben Rimoz (born 20 November 1944) is an Israeli former international footballer who competed at the 1970 FIFA World Cup.

Ben Rimoz played club football for Hapoel Jerusalem and Bnei Yehuda Tel Aviv, scoring 85 goals in 319 league games and 106 goals in 351 games in all competitions.

Ben Rimoz played in one official game for the Israeli national side.

References

1947 births
Living people
Israeli footballers
Israel international footballers
1970 FIFA World Cup players
Hapoel Jerusalem F.C. players
Bnei Yehuda Tel Aviv F.C. players
Association football forwards
Israeli Football Hall of Fame inductees